Radosław is a Slavic name meaning "someone who celebrates happiness". It may refer to:

People 
 Radosław Sikorski (1963-), a Polish politician and journalist. Former Marshal of the Sejm (speaker) of the parliament of Poland.
 Radosław Popławski (1983-), a Polish long-distance runner
 Jan Mazurkiewicz, (1896-1988) codename Radosław, was a colonel of Armia Krajowa and a general in the People's Army of Poland.

Places 
Radosław, Lower Silesian Voivodeship (south-west Poland)
Radosław, Pomeranian Voivodeship (north Poland)
Radosław, West Pomeranian Voivodeship (north-west Poland)

See also

Radoslav (disambiguation)
Slavic names
Polish name

Polish masculine given names
Slavic masculine given names

cs:Radoslav
ru:Радослав
sk:Radoslav